Cryptocarya microneura is a rainforest tree growing at the eastern coastal parts of Australia.

Habitat 

Common in most warm temperate rainforest areas on the poorer sedimentary soils, but also in the littoral rainforests. It grows from near Batemans Bay in the southern Illawarra area (35° S) in New South Wales to near Nambour, Queensland (26° S).

Description 

Cryptocarya microneura, known as the murrogun is a small or medium-sized tree to around 25 metres tall and 30 cm in diameter.

The bark is grey and somewhat corky on small trees, or greyish brown and scaly on larger trees. The trunk is often irregular or fluted in shape.

Leaves are alternate and simple, with a long blunt point at the tip. Upper surface glossy dark green, under surface paler green.

Flowers appear from September to November, being cream, unscented and in panicles. Flowers are finely downy.

The fruit is a drupe. Shiny, black and pointed. 12 mm in diameter with faint vertical ribs. Eaten by rainforest birds including the topknot pigeon. Like most Australian Cryptocarya fruit, removal of the fleshy aril is advised to assist seed germination.

Cryptocarya microneura is a larval host plant for the butterflies Chaetocneme beata, Netrocoryne repanda and Graphium sarpedon.

References

External links

Trees of Australia
Flora of New South Wales
Flora of Queensland
Laurales of Australia
microneura